Golabari Union is a union of Madhupur Upazila, Tangail District, Bangladesh.

Demographics
According to the 2011 Bangladesh census, Golabari Union had 8,857 households and a population of 33,361.

The literacy rate (age 7 and over) was 38.7% (Male-40.4%, Female-37%).

See also
 Union Councils of Tangail District

References

Populated places in Dhaka Division
Populated places in Tangail District
Unions of Madhupur Upazila